Linkou is a station on the Taoyuan International Airport MRT located in Linkou District, New Taipei, Taiwan. The station opened for commercial service on 2 March 2017.

Station overview

This elevated station has two side platforms and four tracks (for Express Trains to pass through), is only station thought entire Airport MRT line with this type of track layout. It opened for trial service on 2 February 2017, and for commercial service 2 March 2017.

The station is located on the New Taipei side of Linkou Plateau, near the border with Taoyuan. Both adjacent stations are in Taoyuan. Land nearby the station was developed as a joint development project between government and private enterprises. The project construction of a 16-story incorporating residential, commercial, hotel, and public transportation functions.

History
 2017-03-02: The station opened for commercial service with the opening of the Taipei-Huanbei section of the Airport MRT.

Station layout

Exits
Exit 1: Northwest side of intersection of Wenhua 3rd Rd and Bade Rd.

Around the station
 Mitsui Outlet Park Linkou
 Carrefour (Linkou Branch)
 Hsing Wu University
 National Taiwan Normal University - Linkou Campus
 New Taipei Municipal Lin-kou High School
 Hsing Wu High School
 Linkou Zhulinshan Temple (林口竹林山寺)

See also
 Taoyuan Metro

References

Railway stations opened in 2017
2017 establishments in Taiwan
Taoyuan Airport MRT stations